Alphée Poirier (August 20, 1905 – August 9, 1978) was a Quebec politician who served in the Legislative Assembly of Quebec from 1952 to 1960.

He was born in Rimouski, Quebec. He studied medicine at the Université Laval and graduated in 1938.

He won the seat of Bellechasse for the Union nationale in the 1952 Quebec general election, and was re-elected in 1956. He was defeated in the 1960 election.

References
 

1905 births
1978 deaths
Union Nationale (Quebec) MNAs
People from Rimouski
People from Chaudière-Appalaches
Université Laval alumni